The City of Horsham was a local government area about  west-northwest of Melbourne, the state capital of Victoria, Australia.

History

Horsham was initially part of the Shire of Wimmera, and was first incorporated as a borough on 17 November 1882. It became a town on 16 November 1932, and was proclaimed a city on 25 May 1949.

On 20 January 1995, the City of Horsham was abolished, and along with parts of the Shires of Arapiles, Kowree and Wimmera, was merged into the newly created Rural City of Horsham.

Wards
The City of Horsham was not subdivided into wards, with its nine councillors representing the entire area.

Population

* Estimate in 1958 Victorian Year Book.

References

External links
 Victorian Places - Horsham

Horsham